Night After Night is a live double album by Nils Lofgren, released in 1977. It was his fourth solo album.

Track listing 
All tracks composed by Nils Lofgren; except where indicated

 "Take You to the Movies Tonight"
 "Back It Up"
 "Keith Don't Go (Ode to the Glimmer Twin)"
 "Like Rain"
 "Cry Tough"
 "It's Not a Crime"
 "Goin' Back" (Carole King, Gerry Goffin)
 "You're the Weight"
 "Beggar's Day (Eulogy to Danny Whitten)"
 "Moon Tears"
 "Code of the Road"
 "Rock & Roll Crook"
 "Goin' South"
 "Incidentally... It's Over"
 "I Came to Dance"

CD version of the album does not contain the song "Moon Tears". The songs "Back It Up" and "I Came to Dance" have been abridged.
2014 JAPAN MINI LP CD (UICY 76085/6) includes the full track listing on 2 CD's faithful to the original complete and unabridged.

Personnel

 Nils Lofgren - lead vocals, guitars, piano (07)
 Tom Lofgren - guitar, organ, backing vocals
 Wornell "Sonic Prince" Jones - bass, timbales, backing vocals
 David Platshon - drums, percussion
 Rev. Patrick Henderson - piano, organ, backing vocals
Technical
 Produced by David Briggs and Nils Lofgren
 Recorded at Hammersmith Odeon, London; Apollo Theatre, Glasgow; The Roxy, Los Angeles (songs 1-3 & 15)
 Bob Edwards, Tom Anderson, Tim Foster - recording engineer
 Mastered by Phil Brown

References 

Nils Lofgren albums
Albums produced by David Briggs (producer)
1977 live albums
A&M Records live albums